Delevan can refer to:
 Edward C. Delavan, promoter of temperance
 Delevan, California
 Delevan, New York

See also
Delavan (disambiguation)